William McKenzie 151K is an Indian reserve of the Duncan's First Nation in Alberta, located within Northern Sunrise County. It is 33 kilometres north of McLennan.

References

Indian reserves in Alberta